Ferro Tontini (born August 14, 1969, in Anzio) is a retired Italian professional football player.

He played his only Serie A game in the 1989/90 season for A.S. Roma.

1969 births
Living people
People from Anzio
Italian footballers
Association football goalkeepers
Serie A players
Serie B players
A.S. Roma players
Cosenza Calcio 1914 players
Catania S.S.D. players
Modena F.C. players
S.S.D. Lucchese 1905 players
Footballers from Lazio
Sportspeople from the Metropolitan City of Rome Capital